The Free African Society (FAS), founded in 1787,  was a benevolent organization that held religious services and provided mutual aid for "free Africans and their descendants" in Philadelphia. The Society was founded by Richard Allen and Absalom Jones. It was the first Black religious institution in the city and led to the establishment of the first independent Black churches in the United States. 

Founding members, all free Black men, included Samuel Baston, Joseph Johnson, Cato Freedman, Caesar Cranchell, James Potter and William White. Notable members included African-American abolitionists such as Cyrus Bustill, James Forten, and William Gray.

Background 

The Free African Society (FAS) developed as part of the rise in civic organizing following American independence in the 1776 to 1783 Revolutionary War; it was the first black mutual aid society in Philadelphia. The city was a growing center of free blacks, attracted to its jobs and other opportunities.  By 1790, the city had 2,000 free black residents, a number that continued to increase.  In the first two decades after the war, inspired by revolutionary ideals, many slaveholders freed their slaves, especially in the Upper South. Northern states largely abolished slavery. Numerous freedmen migrated to Philadelphia from rural areas of Pennsylvania and the South; it was a growing center of free black society.  In addition, their number 69 was increased by free people of color who were refugees from the Haitian Revolution in Saint-Domingue, as well as fugitive slaves escaping from the South.

Early years: 1797 to 1822 

The FAS was founded in the spring of 1787 in Philadelphia, shortly before the Constitutional Convention was held in the city.

Richard Allen, a Methodist preacher, and Absalom Jones rejected the second-class status blacks were forced into at their white-dominated Methodist church. As their numbers had increased, the church congregation had built a gallery where it asked them to sit separately from the white congregation.  The men and their supporters wanted to create an independent group to meet African-American needs.  They designed the Free African Society as a mutual aid society to help support widows and orphans, as well as the sick or unemployed.  They supported the education of children, or arranged apprenticeships if the children could not attend one of the free schools that were developed.

The FAS provided social and economic guidance, and medical care. It also helped new citizens establish their new sense of self-determination.  While teaching thriftiness and how to save to build wealth, it became the model for banks in the African-American community. It sought to improve the morals of its members by regulating marriages, condemning drunkenness and adultery. Working with the city, it acquired land at Potter's Field for a burying ground; it began to perform and record marriages and also to record births for the people of its community.

To encourage responsibility and create a common aid fund, the FAS asked members to pay dues of one shilling per month. If they failed to pay dues for three months, they were cut off from the society, no longer able to share in its benefits. The dues collected were the fund for the community service projects that the FAS organized. Among these was a food program to help support the community's poor and widowed.

Yellow fever epidemic of 1793 

In aid to the sick, the FAS became famous for its members' charitable work as nurses and aides during the Yellow Fever Epidemic of 1793, when many residents abandoned the city.  The doctor Benjamin Rush believed African Americans were immune to the disease.  He wrote an open letter in the newspaper, under the pseudonym of a well-known Quaker who helped educate blacks, and appealed to blacks to aid others in the city during the epidemic. Allen and Jones decided to respond, together with other members of the FAS who served both black and white residents as nurses and aides during those terrible months.

After all their work, Allen and Jones wrote a memoir about the events, which they published the following year, A Narrative of the Proceedings of the Black People during the late awful calamity ...   They were trying to set the record straight and defend themselves against an accusatory pamphlet published by Mathew Carey, after he had fled the city for much of September 1793.  He accused blacks of charging high prices for nursing, taking advantage of whites, and even of stealing from them during the epidemic. His pamphlet was entitled A Short Account of the Malignant Fever (1793). Allen and Jones noted that it was whites who charged high rates for nursing during the crisis.

1794 to early 1800s 

Many members who wanted more religious affiliation followed Absalom Jones when he founded African Episcopal Church of St. Thomas. It opened its doors in 1794 as the firs.E. Church|Bethel African Methodist Episcopal Church]] (AME Church). In 1803, Cyrus Bustill opened a school for black children in his home, and a year later, Absalom Jones opened another school. By 1837, with financial help from the Quakers and the Pennsylvania Abolition Society, ten private schools for blacks were operating in Philadelphia.

Preamble and articles of the association

See also 
Benefit society
Free African Union Society, Newport, Rhode Island
Garrison Literary and Benevolent Association, New York City

References

Further reading
  Boyd, Herb. Autobiography of a People: Three Centuries of African American History Told by Those Who Lived It, New York: Doubleday, 2000, collection of primary source documents.
Johnson, Charles, Patricia Smith, et al., Preamble with link for text for Free African Society, Part 3: 1791–1831/"Brotherly Love", Africans in America, 1998, PBS, WGBH Educational Foundation. 
"The Free African Society of Philadelphia", DocStoc
 ["1784-1789: The U.S. Constitution"] by Donna Brazile in Four Hundred Souls: A Community History of African America, 1619-2019 edited by Ibram X. Kendi and Keisha N. Blain, pp. 153–157. One World. 2021.

African Americans' rights organizations
African Methodist Episcopal Church
African-American history in Philadelphia
African-American history of Pennsylvania
African-American organizations
American abolitionist organizations
Ethnic fraternal orders in the United States
Nondenominational Christian societies and communities
Organizations based in Philadelphia
Organizations established in 1787